Cannabis Culture is a Canadian online magazine and former print magazine devoted to cannabis and the worldwide cannabis subculture. Cannabis Culture publishes stories about the struggle to legalize marijuana, profiles of marijuana paraphernalia, articles on how to grow marijuana, interviews with prominent marijuana users, and coverage of cannabis cultural events like the Nimbin MardiGrass festival and the High Times Cannabis Cup.

History
The magazine was founded in the spring of 1995 by Marc Emery, a prominent Canadian marijuana legalization activist who is the president of the BC Marijuana Party and well known as the "Prince of Pot". Cannabis Culture Magazine evolved from a publication called "The Marijuana & Hemp Newsletter" launched by Emery in 1994. For the first three years, the magazine was named Cannabis Canada but changed its name to Cannabis Culture with issue number 13, released in July 1998.

The editor of the magazine for the first ten years was Dana Larsen, who left the magazine in April 2005, after issue 54. The magazine thrived under Larsen with the help of the magazine's two regular writers, Pete Brady and Reverend Damuzi.

The print version of Cannabis Culture was printed in Canada and had a distribution of close to 100,000 copies across North America.

In 2000, Cannabis Culture was pulled off store shelves in Timmins, Ontario, Canada. Local police told retailers that it was illegal because it was a "crime comic". Publisher Marc Emery flew to Timmins and gave away copies in front of the police station, and ultimately the police apologized.

Because it promotes the use and cultivation of marijuana, Cannabis Culture Magazine is banned in some countries, such as Australia, and has had problems with New Zealand customs.

In March 2009, Cannabis Culture ceased publication of its print version to devote its resources to its online version, an active website originally launched in March 1995.

Cannabis Culture also hosts an active discussion forum and is the sister site to the Pot TV Network.

On May 10, 2010, Emery was ordered to surrender to authorities and deported to the United States. His wife, Jodie Emery, now runs Cannabis Culture.

References

External links

Official Olympia Hempfest Website
PotTV Network
High Points in Recent Pot Culture History - slideshow by the Los Angeles Times
How To Use CBD For Asthma

Lifestyle magazines published in Canada
Cannabis magazines
Online magazines published in Canada
Defunct magazines published in Canada
Magazines established in 1995
Magazines disestablished in 2009
Online magazines with defunct print editions
1995 in cannabis